The discography of American rock musician Eddie Money consists of 11 studio albums, two live albums, four EPs, and 28 singles. He also released seven compilation albums.

Money's self-titled debut album was released in late 1977. The album spawned three singles, all of which charted on the Billboard Hot 100. However, only the first two: "Baby Hold On" and "Two Tickets to Paradise", charted within the Top 40. The third and final single, "You've Really Got a Hold on Me" placed outside the Top 70. The album became his best-selling album to date, selling more than two million copies in the United States.

Subsequent albums were released between 1978 and 2007; however, none of those albums had the sales success of Eddie Money. He did, though, have success on the singles charts. In 1981, Billboard magazine introduced the Hot Mainstream Rock Tracks chart. Money's first single to chart there, "Think I'm in Love", became his first ever number-one single. He would additionally chart two more chart-toppers between 1986 and 1989, including 1986's "Take Me Home Tonight", which was his highest peaking single on the Hot 100, charting within the Top 5 and 1988's "Walk on Water" charting at number 9. Money died in September 2019.

Studio albums

Compilation albums

Live albums

Extended plays

Singles

Notes

References

Discographies of American artists
Rock music discographies